The 1917–18 team finished with a record of 14–1. It was the 1st year for head coach Elton J. Rynearson.

Roster

Schedule

|-
!colspan=9 style="background:#006633; color:#FFFFFF;"| Non-conference regular season

1. EMU Media guide list score of 28-24 and EMU yearbook list score of 28-14.

2. EMU Media guide list score of 28-15 and EMU yearbook list score of 24-15.

References

https://emueagles.com/sports/2018/11/7/2018-19-mens-basketball-media-guide.aspx?id=943

Eastern Michigan Eagles men's basketball seasons
Michigan State Normal